The United States Environmental Protection Agency's Green Power Partnership is a voluntary program that supports the organizational procurement of green power by offering expert advice, technical support, tools and resources.  It provides public health and environmental benefits by expanding U.S. renewable energy markets through the voluntary use of green power.

The EPA defines 'green power' as a subset of renewable energy and "represents those renewable energy resources and technologies that provide the highest environmental benefit", with electricity produced from solar, wind, geothermal, biogas, biomass, and low-impact small hydroelectric sources listed as types of green power.

The program's key elements include:
 Educating stakeholders on purchasing in U.S. renewable energy markets
 Providing technical assistance and tools for procuring green power
 Motivating stakeholders to use green power
 Recognizing leadership in green power purchasing

Communities
Green Power Communities are defined by the United States Environmental Protection Agency (EPA) as "towns, villages, cities, counties, or tribal governments in which the local government, businesses, and residents collectively buy green power in amounts that meet or exceed EPA's Green Power Community purchase requirements."

See also
 List of U.S. states by electricity production from renewable sources
 List of countries by electricity production from renewable sources

References

External links
Official website

Green Power Partnership
Green Power Partnership